Machimus atricapillus is a Palearctic species of robber fly in the family Asilidae.

References

External links
Geller Grim Robberflies oF Germany
Images representing Machimus atricapillus

Asilidae
Insects described in 1814
Taxa named by Carl Fredrik Fallén
Diptera of Asia